Lieutenant George William Gladstone Gauld was a World War I flying ace credited with five aerial victories.

Gauld ran up a string of five victories late in World War I while flying a Royal Aircraft Factory SE.5a for 74 Squadron. On 30 July 1918, in concert with fellow aces Ira Jones and Harold Shoemaker, he flamed a Rumpler reconnaissance plane. On 2 August, he and Frederick Gordon cooperated to capture an LVG recon plane. On 26 October, Gauld drove down a Fokker D.VII out of control. On 1 November 1918, he captured a Fokker D.VII and drove another one down out of control.

Sources of information

References
Above the Trenches: a Complete Record of the Fighter Aces and Units of the British Empire Air Forces 1915-1920. Christopher F. Shores, Norman L. R. Franks, Russell Guest. Grub Street, 1990. , .

1964 deaths
Canadian World War I flying aces
Year of birth missing